Jonathan Davis (born 1971) is an American musician, the lead singer of Korn.

Jonathan Davis may also refer to:
Jonathan Davis (fencer) (born 1960), British (Northern Ireland) Olympic fencer
Jonathan Davis (journalist) (born 1954), British author, editor and journalist specialising in finance
Jonathan Davis (baseball) (born 1992), American baseball outfielder
Jonathan D. Davis (1795–1853), U.S. politician, member of the Michigan Senate
Jonathan M. Davis (1871–1943), U.S. politician
Jonathan R. Davis (1816–?), American west gunfighter
Q-Tip (musician) (born 1970), North American entertainer, born Jonathan Davis

See also
Johnathan Davis, co-owner and CEO of IBT Media
Johnathan Davis (politician), Australian legislator
Johnny Davis (basketball, born 2002), American basketball player
Jon Davis (disambiguation)
Jon Davies, American meteorologist
Jonathan Davies (disambiguation)